Calretinin, also known as calbindin 2 (formerly 29 kDa calbindin), is a calcium-binding protein involved in calcium signaling.  In humans, the calretinin protein is encoded by the CALB2 gene.

Function 
This gene encodes an intracellular calcium-binding protein belonging to the troponin C superfamily. Members of this protein family have six EF-hand domains which bind calcium. This protein plays a role in diverse cellular functions, including message targeting and intracellular calcium buffering.

Calretinin is abundantly expressed in neurons including retina (which gave it the name) and cortical interneurons. Expression was found in different neurons than that of the similar vitamin D-dependent calcium-binding protein, calbindin-28kDa.

Calretinin has an important role as a modulator of neuronal excitability including the induction of long-term potentiation.  Loss of expression of calretinin in hippocampal interneurons has been suggested to be relevant in temporal lobe epilepsy.

It is expressed in a number of other locations including hair follicles.

Clinical significance 
Calretinin is a diagnostic marker for some human diseases, including Hirschsprung disease and some cancers.

Mesothelioma 
Using immunohistochemistry, calretinin can be demonstrated in both benign mesothelium and in malignant mesothelioma and can be used to help differentiate different lung tumours. Antibodies to calretinin can also be used to distinguish between different types of brain tumour, demonstrating only those with neuronal rather than glial, differentiation. Furthermore, the essential function of calretinin in mesothelioma cell lines has been demonstrated in vitro and may be an interesting target for therapeutical approaches.

Hirschsprung disease
In Hirschsprung disease, calretinin immunohistochemistry offers additional diagnostic value in specimens with inadequate amount of submucosa and rarely seen ganglion cells.  The presence of ganglion cells consistently correlated with calretinin-positive thin nerve fibrils in the lamina propria, muscularis mucosae and superficial submucosa.  These calretinin-positive thin neurofibrils are absent in the aganglionic segments of bowel and in the areas without ganglion cells from the junction of normal with diseased rectum.  Calretinin is strongly expressed in the submucosal and subserosal nerve trunks in the ganglionic segment.  No calretinin expression is seen in the nerve trunks in the rest of the aganglionic segment.  It has faint expression in the thick nerve trunks from the areas without ganglion cells.  Faint positivity of the thick submucosal and subserosal nerves in the absence of ganglion cells and calretinin positive nerve fibrils, is characteristic of the junction of the aganglionic-to-normal rectum.

References

Further reading

External links